You Belong to Me is a 2004 compilation album of songs recorded by American singer Jo Stafford. It is one of many Stafford compilations to have been released in the early 2000s under the title You Belong to Me, the name derived from the song of the same name, which became one of her best known hits during the 1950s. This album was released on June 29, 2004 and appears on the Memoir label.

Track listing

 Kissin' Bug Boogie		 	
 Hawaiian War Chant		 	
 Jambalaya (On the Bayou)		 	
 Gabriella (The Gamblin' Lady)		 	
 Georgia on My Mind		 	
 Always True to You in My Fashion		 	
 I Hate Men		 	
 Wunderbar		 	
 Walkin' My Baby Back Home		 	
 Early Autumn		 	
 The Moment I Saw You		 	
 Our Very Own		 	
 Pretty Eyed Baby		 	
 Shrimp Boats		 	
 Around the Corner		 	
 I'm Gonna Wash That Man Right Outa My Hair		 	
 Some Enchanted Evening		 	
 With These Hands		 	
 Stardust		 	
 No Other Love		 	
 Don't Worry 'Bout Me		 	
 You Belong to Me		 	
 Allentown Jail		 	
 Tennessee Waltz

References

2004 compilation albums
Jo Stafford compilation albums